The 2012–13 season is the 125th competitive association football season in India.

Promotion and relegation
Teams relegated from the I-League:
 Chirag United Club Kerala
 HAL

Teams promoted to the I-League:
 ONGC
 United Sikkim

India national football team

Men

2014 AFC Challenge Cup qualification

Friendlies

2012 Nehru Cup

India U16

2012 AFC U-16 Championship

Women

2014 AFC Women's Asian Cup qualification

2012 SAFF Women's Championship

Friendlies

I-League

Federation Cup

Durand Cup

Santosh Trophy

References

 
Seasons in Indian football